Nogometni klub Triglav Kranj, commonly referred to as NK Triglav Kranj or simply Triglav, is a Slovenian football club from Kranj. The team competes in the Slovenian Second League, the second highest league in Slovenia. The club was founded in 1920. In the mid-1990s, they merged with NK Naklo and were re-established under the current name Triglav Kranj.

Name changes

1920: Formed as SK Korotan
1937: Renamed as SK Kranj
1945: Renamed as Storžič
1947: Renamed as Udarnik
1949: Renamed as Korotan
1955: Renamed as Triglav
1994: Renamed as Triglav Creina
1997: Re-established as Triglav Kranj

Honours
League
Slovenian Republic League
 Winners: 1950, 1951

Slovenian Second League
 Winners: 1997–98, 2000–01, 2016–17

Cup
Slovenian Republic Cup
 Winners: 1983–84

 MNZG-Kranj Cup
 Winners: 1991–92, 1996–97, 1999–2000, 2000–01, 2003–04, 2006–07, 2008–09, 2009–10, 2014–15, 2015–16, 2016–17

League history

References

External links
 Official website 
 PrvaLiga profile 

 
Association football clubs established in 1920
Association football clubs established in 1997
1920 establishments in Slovenia
1997 establishments in Slovenia
Sport in Kranj
Football clubs in Slovenia